Doris Callebaut (born December 22, 1952) is an Indonesian actress and model who is an Indo of mixed Javanese-Minahasan-Sundanese-Belgian-Dutch 
descent. A sex symbol of the 1970s, she is known for her role as Inem in Inem Pelayan Sexy series, from 1976 until 1977. She is the daughter of film editor Emile Callebaut, and the niece of actress Mimi Mariani and Sri Murniati.

Early life 
Doris Callebaut was born on December 22, 1952, in Jakarta, Indonesia, as the eldest child and daughter of the five children of Emile Callebaut and Wilhelmina Ramers. Her brothers were Roy Callebaut and Peter Callebaut, while her sister were Yvonne Ursula Callebaut.

Doris's father, Emile, a Indonesia-based film editor, who was the brother of actress Mimi Mariani and Sri Murniati. While her mother, Wilhelmina, a Manado-Sundanese descent from Cirebon. She completed her teacher school education.

Career 
Callebaut formerly worked as a hostess and kindergarten teacher. She made her film debut as the female lead in Embun Pagi (1976), credited as Doris Trissyanthy. She later starred in Nya Abbas Akup's directed sex comedy Inem Pelayan Sexy (1976), who later became box office success, and launch her career.

Filmography 
During her five-year career, Callebaut appeared in twenty eight films:

 Embun Pagi (1976)
 Inem Pelayan Sexy (1976)
 Boss Bagio dalam Gembong Ibukota (1976)
 Inem Pelayan Sexy II (1977)
 Inem Pelayan Sexy II (1977)
 Inem Nyonya Besar (1977)
 Sejuta Duka Ibu (1977)
 Cowok Komersil (1977)
 Gara-gara Isteri Muda (1977)
 Akibat Pergaulan Bebas (1977)
 Garis-garis hidup (1977)
 Warung Pojok (1977)
 Hujan Duit (1977)

References

External links 

1952 births
Living people